What Have They Done to Your Daughters? is a 1974 Italian giallo and poliziotteschi film directed by Massimo Dallamano.

Plot
Police officers investigated the death of 14-year-old Silvia Polvesi who has been found hanged after receiving an anonymous phone call. After interrogating suspects and witnesses, a tape is discovered where several sexual encounters were recorded. This leads the police to an under-age prostitution ring and a motorcycle riding serial killer.

Cast
Giovanna Ralli as Deputy Attorney Vittoria Stori
Claudio Cassinelli as Commissioner Silvestri
Mario Adorf as Commissioner Valentini
Franco Fabrizi as Bruno Paglia
Farley Granger as Mr. Polvesi
Marina Berti as Miss Polvesi
Paolo Turco as Marcello Tosti 
Corrado Gaipa as Prosecutor
Micaela Pignatelli as Rosa
Sherry Buchanan as Silvia Polvesi 
 Attilio Dottesio as the Coroner

Production
The film was shot at Dear Studios in Rome.

Style
The film is considered a hybrid of two genres: the giallo and the poliziottesco. The film was one among the many hybrid gialli made predominantly between 1974 and 1975 when the popularity of the giallo was waning at the Italian box office while the poliziottesco were beginning to gain box office dominance.

Release
The film was released in Italy on 10 August 1974 and was distributed by P.A.C. The film grossed a total of 1,344,301,000 Italian lira on its domestic release.

It was released on Blu-ray by Arrow Video on August 14, 2018 and restored from the original camera negative.

Reception
In his book Italian Crime Filmography, 1968–1980, Roberto Curti described the film as the best of the giallo and poliziottesco hybrids, stating that "Dallamano's direction is well above average". Danny Shipka, author of a book on European exploitation films found the film "doesn't hold as much of a grip as" What Have You Done to Solange? as it focused too much on police protocol, but was still "an intense gritty film that deserves to be seen."

Footnotes

References

External links

 

1974 films
1970s crime thriller films
Films directed by Massimo Dallamano
Films scored by Stelvio Cipriani
Giallo films
Poliziotteschi films
Films shot in Rome
Films shot in Milan
Films set in Lombardy
Films about child abduction
Films about child prostitution
Films about human trafficking
Works about sex trafficking
1970s Italian films